Green Integer is an American publishing house of pocket-sized belles-lettres books, based in Los Angeles, California. It was founded in 1997 by Douglas Messerli, whose former publishing house was Sun & Moon, and it is edited by Per Bregne.

Green Integer is one of the most active publishers of literary translations in the United States—particularly poetry. Notable authors published by Green Integer include: Djuna Barnes, Paul Auster, Eleanor Antin, Adonis, Ko Un, Tomas Tranströmer, Arthur Schnitzler, Paul Celan, Gertrude Stein, Robert Bresson, Richard Kalich, Charles Bernstein.

External links 
 Green Integer website

References 

Publishing companies established in 1997
Book publishing companies based in California
Companies based in Los Angeles